The Sauber C19 was the car with which the Sauber Formula One team competed in the 2000 Formula One season.  It was driven by the experienced pairing of Mika Salo and Pedro Diniz, who had previously been teammates at Arrows in 1998.

The car proved to be reasonably competitive, but not enough to escape from the large midfield group. Salo scored six points, but could not resist an offer from the fledgling Toyota team and left after the season finished, whilst Diniz failed to score any points and was dropped at the end of the year. The team finished eighth in the Constructors' Championship – same position as in 1999, but with more points.

The team experienced one of the worst races of its F1 career at the 2000 Brazilian Grand Prix, when both cars were withdrawn from the race after repeated rear wing failures caused by the bumpy track surface.

This car introduced twin front suspension mounting pylons, a design that would be used enhanced the following year.

Complete Formula One results
(key) (results in bold indicate pole position)

References

C19
2000 Formula One season cars